County Monaghan is a county in Ireland. It is in the province of Ulster and is part of Border strategic planning area of the Northern and Western Region. It is named after the town of Monaghan. Monaghan County Council is the local authority for the county. The population of the county was 61,386 according to the 2016 census.

The county has existed since 1585 when the Mac Mathghamhna rulers of Airgíalla agreed to join the Kingdom of Ireland. Following the 20th-century Irish War of Independence and the signing of the Anglo-Irish Treaty, Monaghan was one of three Ulster counties to join the Irish Free State rather than Northern Ireland.

Geography and subdivisions
County Monaghan is the fifth smallest of the Republic's 26 counties by area, and the fourth smallest by population. It is the smallest of Ulster's nine counties in terms of population.

Baronies

 Cremorne
 Dartree
 Farney
 Monaghan
 Truagh

Civil parishes and townlands

Towns and villages
 Ballinode
 Ballybay
 Carrickmacross
 Castleblayney
 Clones
 Clontibret
 Doohamlet
 Drum
 Emyvale
 Inniskeen
 Glaslough
 Killanny
 Knockatallon
 Magheracloone
 Monaghan
 Newbliss
 Oram
 Rockcorry
 Scotshouse
 Scotstown
 Smithborough
 Threemilehouse
 Tydavnet
 Tyholland
 Truagh

Largest Towns in County Monaghan (2016 Census)
1. Monaghan = 7,678  
2. Carrickmacross = 5,032 
3. Castleblayney = 3,607 
4. Clones = 1,680 
5. Ballybay = 1,241

Geography

Notable mountains include Slieve Beagh (on the Tyrone and Fermanagh borders), Mullyash Mountain and Coolberrin Hill (214 m, 702 ft). Lakes include Lough Avaghon, Dromore Lough, Drumlona Lough, Lough Egish, Emy Lough, Lough Fea, Inner Lough (in Dartrey Forest), Muckno Lough and White Lough. Notable rivers include the River Fane (along the Louth border), the River Glyde (along the Louth and Meath borders), the Ulster Blackwater (along the Tyrone border) and the Dromore River (along the Cavan border, linking Cootehill to Ballybay).

Monaghan has a number of forests, including Rossmore Forest and Dartrey Forest. Managed by Coillte since 1988, the majority of trees are conifers. Due to a long history of intensive farming and recent intensive forestry practices, only small pockets of native woodland remain.

The Finn Bridge is a border crossing point over the River Finn to County Fermanagh. It is close to Scotshouse.

Geology
Lead used to be mined in County Monaghan. Mines included Annaglogh Lead Mines and Lisdrumgormley Lead Mines.

History
In 1585, the English Lord Deputy of Ireland, Sir John Perrot, visited the area and met the Irish chieftains. They requested that Ulster be divided into counties and land in the kingdom of Airgíalla be apportioned to the local chiefs. A commission was established to accomplish this and County Monaghan came into being. The county was subdivided into five baronies: Farney, Cremorne, Dartrey, and Monaghan controlled by MacMahon and Truagh by McKenna.

After the defeat of the rebellion of The Earl of Tyrone and the Ulster chieftains in 1603, the county was not planted like the other counties of Ulster. The lands were instead left in the hands of the native chieftains. In the Irish Rebellion of 1641, the McMahons and their allies joined the general rebellion of Irish Catholics. Following their defeat, some colonisation of the county took place by Scottish and English families.

Inland waterways
County Monaghan is traversed by the derelict Ulster Canal. However, Waterways Ireland are embarking on a scheme to reopen the canal from Lough Erne into Clones.

Railways
It became part of the Great Northern Railway (GNR) in 1876. The partition of Ireland in 1922 turned the boundary with County Armagh into an international frontier, after which trains were routinely delayed by customs inspections. This left the GNR Board with no option but to withdraw passenger services between Armagh and Clones as well. CIÉ took over the remaining section of line between Clones, Monaghan and Glaslough in 1958,  but withdrew goods services between Monaghan and Glaslough in 1959 and between Clones and Monaghan in 1960, leaving Monaghan with no railway service.

Governance and politics

Local government

At the 2019 local election, County Monaghan was divided into three local electoral areas, each of formed a municipal district: Ballybay–Clones, Carrickmacross–Castleblayney, and Monaghan.

Former districts
The towns of Ballybay, Carrickmacross, Castleblayney, Clones and Monaghan were formerly represented by nine-member town councils which dealt with local matters such as the provision of utilities and housing. These were abolished in 2014 under the Local Government Reform Act 2014.

National politics 
For elections to Dáil Éireann, the county is part of the constituency of Cavan–Monaghan which elects five TDs. In the 2011 general election, there was a voter turnout of 72.7%.

For elections to the European Parliament, the county is part of the Midlands–North-West constituency.

Culture and architecture
County Monaghan is the birthplace of the poet and writer Patrick Kavanagh, who based much of his work in the county. Kavanagh is one of the most significant figures in 20th-century Irish poetry. The poems "Stony Grey Soil" and "Shancoduff" refer to the county.

County Monaghan has produced several successful artists. Chief among these is George Collie (1904–75), who was born in Carrickmacross and trained at the Dublin Metropolitan School of Art. He was a prolific exhibitor at the Royal Hibernian Academy throughout his lifetime and is represented by works in the collection of the National Gallery of Ireland and the Ulster Museum.

County Monaghan was also the home county of the Irish writer Sir Shane Leslie (1885–1971), 3rd Baronet of Glaslough, who lived at Castle Leslie in the north-east corner of the county. A Catholic convert, Irish nationalist and first cousin of Sir Winston Churchill, Prime Minister of the United Kingdom, Leslie became an important literary figure in the early 1900s. He was a close friend of many politicians and writers of the day including the American novelist F. Scott Fitzgerald (1896–1940), who dedicated his second novel, The Beautiful and Damned, to Leslie.

Monaghan County Museum is recognised as one of the leading provincial museums in Ireland, with a Council of Europe Award (1980), among others, to its credit. Located in Hill Street, Monaghan Town, the museum aims to reflect the history of County Monaghan and its people in all its richness and diversity.

The best of the county's architecture developed in the Georgian and Victorian periods and ranges from the dignified public spaces of Church Square and The Diamond in Monaghan Town to the great country houses of Lough Fea, Carrickmacross; Hilton Park, Clones and Castle Leslie, Glaslough.

Significant ecclesiastical buildings include St Joseph's Catholic Church in Carrickmacross; the Gothic-Revival St Patrick's Church of Ireland Church, Monaghan Town, and St Macartan's Catholic Cathedral, Monaghan Town, by J. J. McCarthy (1817–1882).

Economy
Agriculture is a significant part of the County Monaghan economy, employing about 12% of the population in 2011 (compared with 5% nationally). The county is the main source of egg supplies in the Republic of Ireland.

Notable Monaghan people

Literature and scholarship
 Patrick Kavanagh (21 October 1904 – 30 November 1967) – Poet
 Patrick McCabe – Novelist and member of Aosdána. Born 1955.
 Eugene McCabe – Playwright, novelist and screenwriter, also a member of Aosdána. Born 1930, lives in Clones.
 Sir Shane Leslie, 3rd Bt (1885–1971) - Writer and political activist, 3rd Baronet of Glaslough and first-cousin of Sir Winston Churchill. Resided at Castle Leslie.
 Evelyn Shirley – Writer and antiquarian. Resided at Lough Fea House near Carrickmacross.
 John Robert Gregg (1867–1948) – Pioneer of modern shorthand writing.
 Sir Tyrone Guthrie (1900–1971) – Writer, theatrical director and founder of the Tyrone Guthrie Centre. Born in Royal Tunbridge Wells, his maternal grandmother was from Newbliss. He settled at Annaghmakerrig House in Co. Monaghan late in his life.

Politics and military
 Andrew, 11th Baron Blayney (1770–1834), a prominent military commander with the British Army, especially during the Napoleonic Wars. Also had Castleblayney, his estate town, rebuilt in the early nineteenth century.
 Sir Charles Gavan Duffy (12 April 1816 – 9 February 1903), Irish Nationalist and Australian politician who served as Prime Minister of the Colony of Victoria. Born in Monaghan town.
 Joseph Finegan (17 November 1814 – 29 October 1885), Confederate General and victor at the Battle of Olustee
 Francis Fitzpatrick (1859–1933), recipient of the Victoria Cross
 Eoin O'Duffy (20 October 1892 – 30 November 1944), turns Chief of Staff of the Irish Republican Army, Commissioner of the Garda Síochána and leader of the Blueshirts and of Fine Gael. He was also Commander of the Irish Brigade in the Spanish Civil War. Born near Castleblayney.
 Sir Basil Kelly (1920–2008) - UUP politician and senior-ranking Northern Irish judge. He served as the last Attorney General for Northern Ireland under the old Stormont regime, serving in the late 1960s and early 1970s. Born in County Monaghan but raised and educated in Belfast.
 Juan Mackenna (1771–1814), veteran of the Chilean War of Independence and Co-Liberator of Chile.
 Dr Heber MacMahon, Lord Bishop of Clogher - Catholic prelate who also served as a military commander for the 'Confederation of Kilkenny' during the 1640s. He commanded at the Battle of Scarrifholis, near Letterkenny, in 1650. Bishop MacMahon was born in Inishkeen.
 Sir William Whitla (1851–1933), physician and politician. Born and raised in Monaghan Town.
 Thomas Taggart (1856–1929), United States Senator and Mayor of Indianapolis.
 Charles Davis Lucas (1834–1914), A native of County Armagh who was the first-ever recipient of the Victoria Cross. Resided for a time at Castleshane.
 Fergal O'Hanlon (1936–1957), IRA volunteer, killed during the Border Campaign.
 Thomas Hughes (1885–1942), Soldier and recipient of the Victoria Cross.
 Patricia McKenna, former MEP
 Dr Rory O'Hanlon, politician, former Ceann Comhairle and former cabinet minister. Born 1934.
 David Nelson, recipient of the Victoria Cross
 David Storey (1856–1924), member of the New South Wales Legislative Assembly
 Jim Lynagh, Commander East Tyrone Brigade IRA
 Séamus McElwaine, OC South Fermanagh Brigade IRA

Sport
 Dame Mary Bailey (1890–1960), aviator who was the daughter of The 5th Baron Rossmore and wife of Sir Abe Bailey, the South African 'Randlord'.
 Barry McGuigan, world Boxing Champion 1985. Born in Clones 28 February 1960.
 Tommy Bowe, Rugby Union player, born in Monaghan town, 22 February 1984.
 James Cecil Parke (1881–1946), Tennis and rugby player. Olympic silver medalist in tennis, twice winner of the Wimbledon Mixed Doubles title and Australian Men's Singles title winner. Captain of the Irish rugby team
 Kevin McBride, Olympic Boxer
 John McKenna (1855–1936), the first manager of Liverpool Football Club along with W.E. Barclay.

Music and entertainment
 "Big Tom" McBride, country Singer
 Oliver Callan, satirist and mimic, born in the county in December 1980.
 The Flaws, indie Rock Band from Carrickmacross.
 Ryan Sheridan, singer and guitarist
 Terry Cavanagh, video game designer

Acting
 Caitriona Balfe, fashion model and actress
 Ardal O'Hanlon, actor and comedian
 Charlene McKenna, actress
 Aoibhinn McGinnity, actress

Art
 Alexander Williams (1846–1930), Artist, born in Monaghan town.

Religion
 Dr John Darley (1799–1884), Church of Ireland Lord Bishop of Kilmore, Elphin and Ardagh, 1874–84.
 George Jeffreys (1889–1962), Welsh founder of the Elim Pentecostal Church, which was first established in Monaghan town in 1915. The movement now has some 9,000 churches worldwide.
 Ellen McKenna (1819–1883), Irish Sisters of Mercy nun, American civil war nurse and teacher.

Twin cities

County Monaghan is twinned with the following places:
  Geel, Flanders, Belgium
  Prince Edward Island, Canada
  Miramichi, New Brunswick, Canada
  Peterborough, Ontario, Canada

See also
 List of abbeys and priories in the Republic of Ireland (County Monaghan)
 Lord Lieutenant of Monaghan
 High Sheriff of Monaghan

Notes

External links

 Monaghan County Council
 Monaghan Tourism Map
 Sliabh Beagh Hotel and Tourism Centre
 History: Overview and Resources, The McMahon Story, Clogherhistory.ie
 Description of County Monaghan (1900)
 Monaghan Architecture
 US protest as map of Monaghan bears an uncanny resemblance to an outline map of Iraq

 

 
Monaghan
Monaghan
Monaghan